The list of secondary schools in Hong Kong is arranged by 18 districts of Hong Kong. It includes government schools, aided schools, Direct Subsidy Scheme (DSS) schools, private schools, as well as English Schools Foundation (ESF) schools and other international schools. Note that many secondary schools in Hong Kong are named "colleges", while they are not tertiary institutions.

Secondary schools in Hong Kong

Central and Western District
Island School
Hong Kong Academy
King's College
Lok Sin Tong Leung Kau Kui College
Sacred Heart Canossian College
St. Clare's Girls' School
St. Joseph's College
St. Louis School
St. Paul's Co-educational College
St. Paul's College
St. Stephen's Church College
St. Stephen's Girls' College
Ying Wa Girls' School
Raimondi College

Eastern District
Belilios Public School
Canossa College
Caritas Chai Wan Marden Foundation Secondary School
Caritas Lok Yi School – special-needs school for intellectual disability
CCC Kwei Wah Shan College
Cheung Chuk Shan College
The Chinese Foundation Secondary School
Chinese International School
Chong Gene Hang College
Clementi Secondary School
CNEC Lau Wing Sang Secondary School
Cognitio College (Hong Kong)
Delia School of Canada
Fortress Hill Methodist Secondary School – providing skills opportunity curricula
Fukien Secondary School (Siu Sai Wan)
Henrietta Secondary School
HKCT Adult Education Centre (Shau Kei Wan Government Secondary School)
Hon Wah College
Hong Kong Chinese Women's Club College
Hongkong Japanese School (Junior Secondary Section)
Islamic Kasim Tuet Memorial College
Kellett School
Kiangsu-Chekiang College, North Point
Lingnan Hang Yee Memorial Secondary School
Lingnan Secondary School
Man Kiu College
Methodist Church Hong Kong Wesley College
Munsang College (Hong Kong Island)
Po Leung Kuk Yu Lee Mo Fan Memorial School – special-needs school for intellectual disability
Precious Blood Secondary School
Pui Kiu Middle School
Rotary Club of Hong Kong Island West Hong Chi Morninghope School – special-needs school for intellectual disability
Salesian English School (Secondary)
Shau Kei Wan East Government Secondary School
Shau Kei Wan Government Secondary School
Sheng Kung Hui Li Fook Hing Secondary School
St. Joan of Arc Secondary School
St. Mark's School

Islands District
Buddhist Fat Ho Memorial College
Buddhist Wai Yan Memorial College
Caritas Chan Chun Ha Field Studies Centre
Caritas Charles Vath College
Cheung Chau Government Secondary School
Christian Zheng Sheng College
Discovery Bay International School
Discovery College – an English Schools Foundation private school
HKFEW Wong Cho Bau Secondary School
Ho Yu College and Primary School (Sponsored by Sik Sik Yuen)
Ling Liang Church E Wun Secondary School
Po Leung Kuk Mrs. Ma Kam Ming-Cheung Fook Sien College
Tung Chung Catholic School
YMCA of Hong Kong Christian College

Kowloon City District
American International School
Amoy College
Anantara College
Arts and Technology Education Centre
Australian International School Hong Kong
Bishop Hall Jubilee School
Carmel Secondary School
CCC Kei To Secondary School
Chan Sui Ki (La Salle) College
Christian Alliance P. C. Lau Memorial International School
Diocesan Boys' School
Diocesan Girls' School
Heep Yunn School
HKICC Lee Shau Kee School of Creativity
Hoi Ping Chamber of Commerce Secondary School
Holy Carpenter Secondary School
Holy Family Canossian College
Homantin Government Secondary School
Jockey Club Government Secondary School
Jockey Club Sarah Roe School – an English Schools Foundation school for special educational needs
King George V School – an English Schools Foundation school
Kingston International School
Kowloon Tong School|Kowloon Tong School (Secondary Section)
Kowloon True Light Middle School
La Salle College
Mary Rose School – special-needs school for intellectual disability
Maryknoll Convent School (Secondary Section)
Munsang College
New Asia Middle School
Notre Dame College
Pentecostal School
Po Leung Kuk Ngan Po Ling College
Pooi To Middle School
Pui Ching Middle School
Rhenish Church Pang Hok-ko Memorial College
 Scientia Secondary School (formerly called Workers' Children Secondary School)
Sear Rogers International School – Peninsula
Sheng Kung Hui Holy Trinity Church Secondary School
Sheng Kung Hui Tsoi Kung Po Secondary School
Shun Tak Fraternal Association Seaward Woo College
St. Teresa Secondary School
Tang King Po School, Kowloon
Times College, private full-time secondary school
Tung Wah Group of Hospitals Wong Fut Nam College
Wa Ying College
Yew Chung International School – Secondary
Yu Chun Keung Memorial College
YWCA Hioe Tjo Yoeng College

Kwai Tsing District
Buddhist Sin Tak College
Buddhist Yip Kei Nam Memorial College
Caritas St. Joseph Secondary School
Carmel Alison Lam Foundation Secondary School
CCC Chuen Yuen College
CCC Yenching College
CNEC Christian College
CNEC Lee I Yao Memorial Secondary School
Cotton Spinners Association Secondary School
Daughters of Mary Help of Christians Siu Ming Catholic Secondary School
HKSYC & IA Chan Nam Chong Memorial College
HKSYC & IA Chan Nam Chong Memorial School – special-needs school for intellectual disability
Hong Chi Winifred Mary Cheung Morning School – special-needs school for intellectual disability
Hong Kong Taoist Association the Yuen Yuen Institute No.1 Secondary School
Ju Ching Chu Secondary School (Kwai Chung)
Kiangsu-Chekiang College (Kwai Chung)
Kwai Chung Methodist College
Lai King Catholic Secondary School
Lingnan Dr. Chung Wing Kwong Memorial Secondary School
Lions College
Lok Sin Tong Ku Chiu Man Secondary School
Lok Sin Tong Leung Chik Wai Memorial School
Lutheran School for the Deaf – special-needs school for hearing impairment
Methodist Lee Wai Lee College
Po Leung Kuk Lo Kit Sing (1983) College
Po Leung Kuk Mr. & Mrs. Chan Pak Keung Tsing Yi School – special-needs school for intellectual disability
Pope Paul VI College
Queen's College Old Boys' Association Secondary School
Queen's College Old Boys' Association Tsing Yi Evening School
Salesians of Don Bosco Ng Siu Mui Secondary School
Sam Shui Natives Association Lau Pun Cheung School – special-needs school for intellectual disability
Shek Lei Catholic Secondary School
Sheng Kung Hui Lam Woo Memorial Secondary School
Shun Tak Fraternal Association Lee Shau Kee College
Spastics Association of Hong Kong B. M. Kotewall Memorial School – special-needs school for physical disability
Tung Wah Group of Hospitals Chen Zao Men College
Tung Wah Group of Hospitals Mrs. Wu York Yu Memorial College
Tung Wah Group of Hospitals S. C. Gaw Memorial College

Kwun Tong District
Buddhist Ho Nam Kam College
CCC Kei Chi Secondary School
CCC Kei Shun Special School – special-needs school for intellectual disability
CCC Mong Man Wai College
Delia Memorial Evening School (Kwun Tong)
Delia Memorial Matriculation Evening Course (Kwun Tong)
Delia Memorial School (Hip Wo)
Delia Memorial School (Matteo Ricci)
Delia Memorial School (Yuet Wah)
Evan China Fellowship Holy Word School – special-needs school for intellectual disability
ECF Saint Too Canaan College
FDBWA Szeto Ho Secondary School
Fukien Secondary School
HKWMA Chu Shek Lun Secondary School
Hong Kong Red Cross Princess Alexandra School – special-needs school for physical disability
Hong Kong Sheng Kung Hui Bishop Hall Secondary School
Hong Kong Taoist Association Ching Chung Secondary School
Ko Lui Secondary School
Kwun Tong Government Secondary School
Kwun Tong Kung Lok Government Secondary School
Kwun Tong Lutheran College
Kwun Tong Lutheran Evening School
Kwun Tong Maryknoll College
Leung Shek Chee College
Maryknoll Secondary School
Mission Covenant Church Holm Glad College
Mu Kuang English School
Ning Po College
Ning Po No.2 College
NLSI Lui Kwok Pat Fong College
Po Chiu Catholic Secondary School
Sheng Kung Hui Kei Hau Secondary School
Sheng Kung Hui Leung Kwai Yee Secondary School
Shun Lee Catholic Secondary School
Sing Yin Secondary School
Society of Boys' Centres Shing Tak Centre School – school for social development
St. Antonius Girls' College
St. Catharine's School for Girls
St. Joseph's Anglo-Chinese School
St. Paul's School (Lam Tin)
United Christian College (Kowloon East)
Yan Chai Hospital Law Chan Chor Si College

North District
Caritas Fanling Chan Chun Ha Secondary School
CCC Kei San Secondary School
Christian Alliance S. W. Chan Memorial College
De La Salle Secondary School, N.T.
Elegantia College (Sponsored by Education Convergence)
Fanling Government Secondary School
Fanling Kau Yan College
Fanling Lutheran Secondary School
Fanling Rhenish Church Secondary School
Fung Kai Liu Man Shek Tong Secondary School
Fung Kai No.1 Secondary School
HHCKLA Buddhist Ma Kam Chan Memorial English Secondary School
HHCKLA Buddhist Po Kwong School – special-needs school for intellectual disability
Hong Kong Taoist Association Tang Hin Memorial Secondary School
International College Hong Kong
Po Leung Kuk Ma Kam Ming College
Salvation Army Shek Wu School – special-needs school for intellectual disability
Sheng Kung Hui Chan Young Secondary School
Sheung Shui Government Secondary School
St. Francis of Assisi's College
Tin Ka Ping Secondary School
Tung Wah Group of Hospitals Kap Yan Directors' College
Tung Wah Group of Hospitals Li Ka Shing College

Sai Kung District
Carmel Divine Grace Foundation Secondary School
Catholic Ming Yuen Secondary School
Cheng Chek Chee Secondary School of Sai Kung and Hang Hau District, New Territories
Christian and Missionary Alliance Sun Kei Secondary School
Creative Secondary School
Evangel College
G. T. (Ellen Yeung) College
Haven of Hope Sunnyside School – special-needs school for intellectual disability
Heung To Secondary School (Tseung Kwan O)
HHCKLA Buddhist Ching Kok Secondary School
HKCCCU Logos Academy
Hong Chi Morninghill School, Tsui Lam – special-needs school for intellectual disability
Hong Kong Adventist Academy
Hong Kong and Macau Lutheran Church Queen Maud Secondary School
Hong Kong Taoist Association the Yuen Yuen Institute No.3 Secondary School
King Ling College
MKMCF Ma Chan Duen Hey Memorial College
MKMCF Ma Chan Duen Hey Memorial Evening College
Po Kok Secondary School
Po Leung Kuk Ho Yuk Ching (1984) College (was named Po Leung Kuk 1984 College)
Po Leung Kuk Laws Foundation College
Pok Oi Hospital 80th Anniversary Tang Ying Hei College
QualiEd College
Sai Kung Sung Tsun Catholic School
Shun Tak Fraternal Association Cheng Yu Tung Secondary School
Tseung Kwan O Government Secondary School
Tseung Kwan O Pui Chi School – special-needs school for intellectual disability
Tung Wah Group of Hospitals Lui Yun Choy Memorial College
Wellington Education Organization Chang Pui Chung Memorial School
Yan Chai Hospital Lan Chi Pat Memorial Secondary School
Yan Chai Hospital Wong Wha San Secondary School

Sha Tin District
Renaissance College – an English Schools Foundation private school
Baptist Lui Ming Choi Secondary School
Buddhist Kok Kwong Secondary School
Buddhist Wong Wan Tin College
Caritas Lok Jun School – special-needs school for intellectual disability
Caritas Ma On Shan Secondary School
Caritas Resurrection School – special-needs school for intellectual disability
Chinese YMCA College
Chiu Chow Association Secondary School
Choi Jun School – special-needs school for intellectual disability
Christ College
Christian Alliance Cheng Wing Gee College
CUHKFAA Chan Chun Ha Secondary School
GCC & ITKD Lau Pak Lok Secondary School
Helen Liang Memorial Secondary School (Shatin)
HKBUAS Wong Kam Fai Secondary and Primary School
HKCT Adult Education Centre (Sha Tin Government Secondary School)
Hong Kong and Kowloon CCPA Ma Chung Sum Secondary School
Hong Kong Chinese Women's Club Fung Yiu King Memorial Secondary School
Immaculate Heart of Mary College
International Christian School
Jockey Club Ti–I College
Kiangsu-Chekiang College (Shatin)
Kwok Tak Seng Catholic Secondary School
Lam Tai Fai College
Li Po Chun United World College of Hong Kong
Lock Tao Secondary School
Lok Sin Tong Young Ko Hsiao Lin Secondary School
Ma On Shan St. Joseph's Secondary School
Ma On Shan Tsung Tsin Secondary School
Ng Yuk Secondary School
Pentecostal Lam Hon Kwong School
Po Leung Kuk C. W. Chu College
Po Leung Kuk C. W. Chu Education Services Centre (Evening Section)
Po Leung Kuk Wu Chung College
Pok Oi Hospital Chan Kai Memorial College
Pui Kiu College
Sha Tin Government Secondary School
Sha Tin Methodist College
Shatin College – an English Schools Foundation school
Shatin Lutheran Evening School
Shatin Public School – special-needs school for intellectual disability
Shatin Pui Ying College
Shatin Tsung Tsin Secondary School
Sheng Kung Hui Lam Kau Mow Secondary School
Sheng Kung Hui Tsang Shiu Tim Secondary School
Spastics Association of Hong Kong Ko Fook Iu Memorial School – special-needs school for physical disability
St. Rose of Lima's College
Stewards Pooi Kei College
Tak Sun Secondary School
Toi Shan Association College
Tsang Pik Shan Secondary School
Tung Wah Group of Hospitals Mrs. Fung Wong Fung Ting College
Tung Wah Group of Hospitals Wong Fung Ling College
Tung Wah Group of Hospitals Yow Kam Yuen College
Yan Chai Hospital Tung Chi Ying Memorial Secondary School

Sham Shui Po District
Buddhist Tai Hung College
Caritas Jockey Club Lok Yan School – special-needs school for intellectual disability
CCC Ming Yin College
Chan Shu Kui Memorial School
Cheung Sha Wan Catholic Secondary School
Chi Yun School – special-needs school for intellectual disability
China Holiness College
CMA Secondary School
Concordia International School
Concordia Lutheran Evening School
Concordia Lutheran School (Hong Kong)
Delia Memorial Matriculation Evening Course (Broadway)
Delia Memorial Matriculation Evening Course (Glee Path)
Delia Memorial School (Broadway)
Delia Memorial School (Glee Path)
Heung To Middle School
HKCT Adult Education Centre (Kowloon Technical School)
HKSYC & IA Wong Tai Shan Memorial College
Holy Trinity College
Kowloon Technical School
Maria College
Maria Evening College
Maryknoll Fathers' School
Mental Health Association of Hong Kong - Cornwall School – special-needs school for intellectual disability
Nam Wah Catholic Secondary School
Our Lady of the Rosary College
Po Leung Kuk Choi Kai Yau School
Po Leung Kuk Vicwood K.T. Chong Sixth Form College
Po Leung Kuk Tong Nai Kan Junior Secondary College
Saviour Lutheran School – special-needs school for intellectual disability
Sheng Kung Hui St. Mary's Church Mok Hing Yiu College
Society of Boys' Centres Chak Yan Centre School – school for social development
Society of Boys' Centres Hui Chung Sing Memorial School – school for social development
St. Margaret's Co-educational English Secondary and Primary School
Tack Ching Girls' Secondary School
Tak Nga Secondary School
Tsung Tsin Christian Academy
Tsung Tsin Middle School
Tung Wah Group of Hospitals Chang Ming Thien College
Tung Wah Group of Hospitals Kwan Fong Kai Chi School – special-needs school for intellectual disability
United Christian College
Wai Kiu College
Wai Kiu Evening College
Ying Wa College

Southern District
Aberdeen Baptist Lui Ming Choi College
Aberdeen Technical School
Canadian International School of Hong Kong
Caritas Chong Yuet Ming Secondary School
Caritas Wu Cheng-chung Secondary School
Ebenezer New Hope School – special-needs school for visual impairment
Ebenezer School – special-needs school for visual impairment
German Swiss International School
Hong Kong International School
Hong Kong Juvenile Care Centre Chan Nam Cheong Memorial School – school for social development
Hong Kong Red Cross John F. Kennedy Centre – special-needs school for physical disability
Hong Kong Sea School
Hong Kong True Light College
Hong Kong University Graduate Association College
Independent Schools Foundation Academy
Marycove School – school for social development
Po Leung Kuk Wai Yin College
Pui Tak Canossian College
Pui Ying Secondary School
Sacred Heart Canossian College
San Wui Commercial Society Chan Pak Sha School
Sheng Kung Hui Lui Ming Choi Secondary School
Singapore International School
South Island School – an International English Schools Foundation school
St. Peter's Secondary School
St. Stephen's College
Tung Wah Group of Hospitals Tsui Tsin Tong School – special-needs school for intellectual disability
Victoria Shanghai Academy
West Island School – an English Schools Foundation school
Yu Chun Keung Memorial College No.2

Tai Po District
Assembly of God Hebron Evening School
Assembly of God Hebron Secondary School
Buddhist Tai Kwong Chi Hong College
Carmel Holy Word Secondary School
Carmel Pak U Secondary School
CCC Fung Leung Kit Memorial Secondary School
China Holiness Church Living Spirit College
Confucian Ho Kwok Pui Chun College
HKCT Adult Education Centre|HKCT Adult Education Centre (NTHYK Tai Po District Secondary School)
Hong Chi Pinehill School – special-needs school for intellectual disability
Hong Chi Pinehill No.2 School – special-needs school for intellectual disability
Hong Chi Pinehill No.3 School – special-needs school for intellectual disability
Hong Kong and Kowloon Kaifong Women's Association Sun Fong Chung College
Hong Kong Red Swastika Society Tai Po Secondary School
Hong Kong Taoist Association The Yuen Yuen Institute No.2 Secondary School
Hong Kong Teachers' Association Evening Secondary School
Hong Kong Teachers' Association Lee Heng Kwei Secondary School
Kau Yan College
Law Ting Pong Secondary School
Ling Liang Church M. H. Lau Secondary School
New Territories Heung Yee Kuk Tai Po District Secondary School
SALEM-Immanuel Lutheran College
Sheng Kung Hui Bishop Mok Sau Tseng Secondary School
Spastics Association of Hong Kong Jockey Club Elaine Field School– special-needs school for physical disability
Tai Po Sam Yuk Secondary School
Valtorta College
Wong Shiu Chi Secondary School

Tsuen Wan District
AD & FD POHL Leung Sing Tak College
HKCT Adult Education Centre|HKCT Adult Education Centre (Tsuen Wan Government Secondary School)
Ho Fung College (Sponsored by Sik Sik Yuen)
Ho Koon Nature Education cum Astronomical Centre
Holy Cross Lutheran Evening College
Liu Po Shan Memorial College
Lui Ming Choi Lutheran College
Po Leung Kuk Lee Shing Pik College
Po Leung Kuk Yao Ling Sun College
Po on Commercial Association Wong Siu Ching Secondary School
Sheng Kung Hui Li Ping Secondary School
St. Francis Xavier's School, Tsuen Wan
Textile Institute American Chamber of Commerce Woo Hon Fai Secondary School
Tsuen Wan Government Secondary School
Tsuen Wan Public Ho Chuen Yiu Memorial College
Yan Chai Hospital Lim Por Yen Secondary School

Tuen Mun District
Baptist Wing Lung Secondary School
Buddhist Sum Heung Lam Memorial College
Caritas Tuen Mun Marden Foundation Secondary School
Carmel Bunnan Tong Memorial Secondary School
CCC Hoh Fuk Tong College
CCC Tam Lee Lai Fun Memorial Secondary School
Ching Chung Hau Po Woon Secondary School
Christian Alliance College
Christian Alliance S. C. Chan Memorial College
Chung Sing Benevolent Society Mrs. Aw Boon Haw Secondary School
CMA Choi Cheung Kok Secondary School
Harrow International School Hong Kong
HHCKLA Buddhist Leung Chik Wai College
HKCT Adult Education Centre|HKCT Adult Education Centre (Tuen Mun Government Secondary School)
Ho Ngai College|Ho Ngai College (Sponsored by Sik Sik Yuen)
Hong Chi Morninghill School, Tuen Mun – special-educational-needs school for intellectual disability
Hong Chi Morninghope School, Tuen Mun – special-educational-needs school for intellectual disability
Hong Chi Morninglight School, Tuen Mun – special-educational-needs school for intellectual disability
Hong Kong Christian Service Pui Oi School – special-educational-needs school for physical disability
Ju Ching Chu Secondary School (Tuen Mun)
Lui Cheung Kwong Lutheran College
Lui Cheung Kwong Lutheran Evening College
Madam Lau Kam Lung Secondary School of Miu Fat Buddhist Monastery
NLSI Peace Evangelical Secondary School
PAOC Ka Chi Secondary School
Po Leung Kuk Centenary Li Shiu Chung Memorial College
Po Leung Kuk Tang Yuk Tien College
San Wui Commercial Society Secondary School
Semple Memorial Secondary School
Sheng Kung Hui St. Simon's Lui Ming Choi Secondary School
Shi Hui Wen Secondary School
Shun Tak Fraternal Association Leung Kau Kui College
Shun Tak Fraternal Association Tam Pak Yu College
South Tuen Mun Government Secondary School
Stewards MKMCF Ma Ko Pan Memorial College
Tsung Tsin College
Tuen Mun Catholic Secondary School
Tuen Mun Government Secondary School
Tung Wah Group of Hospitals Mr. and Mrs. Kwong Sik Kwan College – providing skills opportunity curricula
Tung Wah Group of Hospitals Sun Hoi Directors' College
Tung Wah Group of Hospitals Yau Tze Tin Memorial college
Yan Chai Hospital No.2 Secondary School
Yan Oi Tong Chan Wong Suk Fong Memorial Secondary School
Yan Oi Tong Tin Ka Ping Secondary School
YPI & CA Lee Lim Ming College

Wan Chai District
Anantara College (Hong Kong)
Buddhist Wong Fung Ling College
CCC Kung Lee College
Concordia Lutheran School - North Point
Confucius Hall Middle School
HKCT Adult Education Centre|HKCT Adult Education Centre (Hotung Secondary School)
Hong Chi Lions Morninghill School – special-needs school for intellectual disability
Hong Kong Tang King Po College
Hotung Secondary School
Island School – an English Schools Foundation school
Jockey Club Hong Chi School – special-needs school for intellectual disability
Lycée Français International Victor Segalen
Marymount Secondary School
Queen's College
Queen's College Old Boys' Association Evening School
Rosaryhill School (Secondary Section)
Sheng Kung Hui Tang Shiu Kin Secondary School
St. Francis' Canossian College
St. Paul's Convent School
St. Paul's Secondary School
Tang Shiu Kin Victoria Government Secondary School
True Light Middle School of Hong Kong
Tung Wah Group of Hospitals Lee Ching Dea Memorial College
Wah Yan College, Hong Kong

Wong Tai Sin District
Assembly of God Evening Secondary School
Assembly of God Morrison College
Buddhist Hung Sean Chau Memorial College
Caritas Pelletier School – school for social development
CCC Heep Woh College
CCC Kei Heep Secondary School
CCC Rotary Secondary School
Chi Lin Buddhist Secondary School – providing skills opportunity curricula
Choi Hung Estate Catholic Secondary School
Chun Tok School – special-needs school for hearing impairment
Cognitio College (Kowloon)
Good Hope School
Ho Lap College (Sponsored by Sik Sik Yuen)
Hong Kong Red Cross Margaret Trench School – special-needs school for physical disability
International Christian Quality Music Secondary and Primary School
Kit Sam Lam Bing Yim Secondary School
Lee Kau Yan Memorial School
Lok Sin Tong Wong Chung Ming Secondary School
Lok Sin Tong Yu Kan Hing Secondary School
Lung Cheung Government Secondary School
Ng Wah Catholic Secondary School
Our Lady's College
PHC Wing Kwong College
Po Leung Kuk Celine Ho Yam Tong College
Po Leung Kuk Centenary School – special-needs school for intellectual disability
Po Leung Kuk No.1 College (Evening Section)
Po Leung Kuk No.1 W. H. Cheung College
Rhenish Church Grace School – special-needs school for intellectual disability
Salvation Army William Booth Secondary School
Sheng Kung Hui St. Benedict's School
St. Bonaventure College and High School
Stewards Pooi Tun Secondary School
Tak Oi Secondary School

Yau Tsim Mong District
CCC Ming Kei College
CCC Mongkok Church Kai Oi School – special-needs school for intellectual disability
Diocesan Girls' School
ELCHK Lutheran Secondary School
HKCT Adult Education Centre (Queen Elizabeth School)
Hong Kong and Kowloon Chiu Chow Public Association Secondary School
HKMA David Li Kwok Po College
Kowloon Sam Yuk Secondary School
Lai Chack Middle School
Lung Kong World Federation School Limited Lau Wong Fat Secondary School
Methodist College
Newman Catholic College
PLK Vicwood KT Chong Sixth Form College
Po Leung Kuk Vicwood K. T. Chong Sixth Form College (Evening School)
Queen Elizabeth School
Sheng Kung Hui All Saints' Middle School
Sir Ellis Kadoorie Secondary School (West Kowloon)
St. Francis Xavier's College
St. Mary's Canossian College
True Light Girls' College
Wah Yan College, Kowloon

Yuen Long District
Bethel High School
Buddhist Mau Fung Memorial College
Buddhist TCFS Yeung Yat Lam Memorial School – special-needs school for intellectual disability
Caritas Lok Kan School – special-needs school for intellectual disability
Caritas Yuen Long Chan Chun Ha Secondary School
CCC Fong Yun Wah Secondary School
CCC Kei Long College
CCC Kei Yuen College
Chinese YMCA Secondary School
Chiu Lut Sau Memorial Secondary School
CUHKFAA Thomas Cheung Secondary School
Cumberland Presbyterian Church Yao Dao Secondary School
ELCHK Lutheran Academy
ELCHK Yuen Long Lutheran College
ELCHK Yuen Long Lutheran Secondary School
Gertrude Simon Lutheran College
Gertrude Simon Lutheran Evening College
Heung To Middle School (Tin Shui Wai)
Ho Dao College (Sponsored by Sik Sik Yuen)
Hong Chi Morningjoy School, Yuen Long – special-needs school for intellectual disability
Hong Chi Morninglight School, Yuen Long] – special-needs school for intellectual disability
Hong Kong Federation of Youth Groups Lee Shau Kee College
Hong Kong Management Association K. S. Lo College
Jockey Club Eduyoung College
Ju Ching Chu Secondary School (Yuen Long)
New Territories Heung Yee Kuk Yuen Long District Secondary School
Pak Kau College
Po Leung Kuk Laws Foundation School – special-needs school for intellectual disability
Pok Oi Hospital Tang Pui King Memorial College
Pui Shing Catholic Secondary School
Queen Elizabeth School Old Students' Association Secondary School
Queen Elizabeth School Old Students' Association Tong Kwok Wah Secondary School
Shap Pat Heung Rural Committee Kung Yik She Secondary School
Sheng Kung Hui Bishop Baker Secondary School
Shun Tak Fraternal Association Yung Yau College
Shung Tak Catholic English College
Tin Shui Wai Government Secondary School
Tin Shui Wai Methodist College
Tung Wah Group of Hospitals C. Y. Ma Memorial College
Tung Wah Group of Hospitals Kwok Yat Wai College
Tung Wah Group of Hospitals Lo Kon Ting Memorial College
YLPMSAA Tang Siu Tong Secondary School
Yuen Long Catholic Secondary School
Yuen Long Lutheran Evening School of the ELCHK
Yuen Long Merchants Association Secondary School
Yuen Long Public Secondary School
Yuen Yuen Institute MFBM Nei Ming Chan Lui Chung Tak Memorial College

Others
Hong Kong Red Cross Hospital Schools – hospital school operating classes at 18 hospitals

Defunct secondary schools
Chung Wah Middle School (1926–1967)
Hong Kong Sam Yuk Secondary School
Po Leung Kuk Tsing Yi Secondary School (Skill Opportunity)
Sam Yuk Middle School

See also
List of schools in Hong Kong
List of primary schools in Hong Kong
List of universities in Hong Kong
List of special schools in Hong Kong
List of international schools in Hong Kong
List of English Schools Foundation schools
:Category:Secondary schools in Hong Kong
:Category:Sixth form colleges in Hong Kong

External links
Education Bureau: School Information Search & School Lists
Secondary School Profiles by Committee on Home-School Co-operation
Education Bureau: Special Education Services
Hong Kong Secondary School Index
School Profile
Secondary
Schools